Dar Parchin-e Olya (also Romanized as Dar Parchīn-e ‘Olyā; also known as Darparchīn-e Bālā) is a village in Milanlu Rural District, in the Central District of Esfarayen County, North Khorasan Province, Iran. At the 2006 census, its population was 29, in 8 families.

References 

Populated places in Esfarayen County